The Pitch is a free alternative newspaper distributed in the Kansas City Metropolitan Area, including Lawrence and Topeka, Kansas.  While known for its investigative stories of the local government, it also covers local sports stories, restaurants, events, visual art, and concerts.
It was started in July 1980 as the Penny Pitch, which was a monthly handout at Penny Lane Record Shop in the Westport area of Kansas City. The original editors were Dwight Frizzell and Jay Mandeville.

Village Voice Media bought The Pitch in 1999, and sold the paper in 2011 to SouthComm Communications. In 2017 The Pitch was sold to Stephanie Carey and Adam Carey.

The Pitch is a member of the Association of Alternative Newsweeklies.

Staff
 Editor - Brock Wilbur
Publisher - Stephanie Carey

References

External links
 
 Story on 2017 change of ownership

Mass media in the Kansas City metropolitan area
Companies based in Kansas City, Missouri
Newspapers published in Kansas
Newspapers published in Missouri
Alternative weekly newspapers published in the United States
Publications established in 1980
1980 establishments in Missouri